ISO 3166-2:TR is the entry for Turkey (spelled "Türkiye") in ISO 3166-2, part of the ISO 3166 standard published by the International Organization for Standardization (ISO), which defines codes for the names of the principal subdivisions (e.g., provinces or states) of all countries coded in ISO 3166-1.

Currently for Turkey, ISO 3166-2 codes are defined for 81 provinces.

Each code consists of two parts, separated by a hyphen. The second part is two digits:
 01–67: provinces as of mid 1980s
 68–71: provinces created in 1989
 72–73: provinces created in 1990
 74: province created in 1991
 75–76: provinces created in 1994
 77–79: provinces created in 1995
 80: province created in 1997
 81: province created in 1999

The digits are currently used in vehicle registration plates and postal codes. The codes 01–67 are assigned in Turkish alphabetical order, except Mersin, Kahramanmaraş and Şanlıurfa, whose codes are assigned based on their historic names, İçel, Maraş and Urfa respectively.

Current codes
Subdivision names are listed as in the ISO 3166-2 standard published by the ISO 3166 Maintenance Agency (ISO 3166/MA).

Subdivision names are sorted in Turkish alphabetical order: a-c, ç, d-g, ğ, h, ı, i-o, ö, p-s, ş, t-u, ü, v-z.

Click on the button in the header to sort each column.

Changes
The following changes to the entry have been announced in newsletters by the ISO 3166/MA since the first publication of ISO 3166-2 in 1998:

See also
 Subdivisions of Turkey
 FIPS region codes of Turkey
 NUTS codes of Turkey

External links
 ISO Online Browsing Platform: TR
 Provinces of Turkey, Statoids.com

2:TR
ISO 3166-2
Turkey geography-related lists